Isabel Steward Way (October 25, 1882 - May 1973) was an American writer, in particular of short stories, who won the first prize for best story published in The Echo during 1927.

Biography
Isabel Steward Way was born on October 25, 1882, in Michigan.

She graduated from Jennings Seminary in Aurora, Illinois, and spent two years at Albion College in Michigan. 

She contributed numerous articles to Saturday Evening Post, The New Yorker and other publications. She published short stories in Brief Stories, Young's, Breezy Stories, New York World, The Echo and others. She won the first prize for best story published in The Echo during 1927. She was the author of "Seed of the Land". 

Way was a member of the San Diego Writers' Club. She lived in Illinois, North Carolina and Florida, and moved to California in 1922, where she lived at 303 N. Mayflower, Monrovia. She married Scott Way.

She died in May 1973 and is buried at Forest Lawn Memorial Park in Glendale, California.

References

1882 births
1973 deaths
20th-century American women writers
American short story writers
Writers from Michigan